A war hammer (French: martel-de-fer, "iron hammer") is a weapon that was used by both foot soldiers and cavalry. It is a very old weapon and gave its name, owing to its constant use, to Judah Maccabee, a 2nd-century BC Jewish rebel, and to Charles Martel, one of the rulers of France. In the 15th and 16th centuries, the war hammer became an elaborately decorated and handsome weapon.

The war hammer was a popular weapon in the late medieval period. It became somewhat of a necessity in combat when armor became so strong that swords and axes were no longer able to pierce and ricocheted upon impact. The war hammer could inflict significant damage on the enemy through their heavy impact without the need to pierce the armor.

Design

A war hammer consists of a handle and a head. The length of the handle may vary, the longest being roughly equivalent to that of a halberd (five to six feet or 1.5 to 1.8 meters), and the shortest about the same as that of a mace (two to three feet or 60 to 90 centimeters). Long war hammers were pole weapons, or polearms, meant for use on foot, whereas short ones were used from horseback.

War hammers, especially when mounted on a pole, could in some cases transmit their impact through helmets and cause concussions. Later war hammers often had a spike on one side of the head, making them more versatile weapons.

The spike end could be used for grappling the target's armor, reins, or shield, If against mounted opponents, the weapon could also be directed at the legs of a horse, toppling the armored foe to the ground where they could be more easily attacked. The side of a war hammer was usually first to knock out and stun an enemy and, once they were on the ground, reversed to punch a hole through the helmet and deliver the coup de grace. A powerful swing from a war hammer can hit its target with a force of several hundred kg/mm2. This is the same penetrating force as a rifle bullet.

Maul
A maul is a long-handled hammer with a heavy head, of wood, lead, or iron. Similar in appearance and function to a modern sledgehammer, it is sometimes shown as having a spear-like spike on the fore-end of the haft.

The use of the maul as a weapon seems to date from the later 14th century. During the Harelle of 1382, rebellious citizens of Paris seized 3000 mauls from the city armory, leading to the rebels' being dubbed Maillotins. Later in the same year, Froissart records French men-at-arms using mauls at the Battle of Roosebeke, demonstrating that they were not simply weapons of the lower classes.

A particular use of the maul was by archers in the 15th and 16th centuries. At the Battle of Agincourt, English longbowmen are recorded as using lead mauls, initially as a tool to drive in stakes but later as improvised weapons. Other references during the century (for example, in Charles the Bold's 1472 Ordinance) suggest continued use. They are recorded as a weapon of Tudor archers as late as 1562.

Gallery

See also
Bec de corbin
Flail (weapon)
Horseman's pick
Kanabō
Lucerne hammer
Mace (bludgeon)
Ōtsuchi
Totokia

References

External links
 Skull from Battle of Towton (1461) showing war hammer wound
 Spotlight: The Medieval Poleaxe, by Alexi Goranov

Hammers
Medieval weapons
Polearms